Heart of Stone is Chris Knight's sixth album. It was released in August 2008.

Track listing
"Homesick Gypsy" (Chris Knight, Austin Cunningham) - 3:51
"Hell Ain't Half Full" (Knight, Gary Nicholson) - 3:38
"Something To Keep Me Going" (Knight, Nicholson) - 3:02
"Heart Of Stone" (Knight, Dan Baird) - 4:14
"Danville" (Knight, Sutherland) - 4:18
"Another Dollar" (Knight) - 3:57
"Almost There" (Knight, Bradberry) - 4:01
"Crooked Road" (Knight, Baird) - 4:32
"Maria" (Knight) - 4:34
"Miles To Memphis" (Knight) - 4:37
"My Old Cars" (Knight, Baird) - 4:25
"Go On Home" (Knight, Nicholson) - 3:23

Personnel
Chris Knight – Vocals and acoustic guitar
Mike McAdam – Electric guitar, bouzouki, slide guitar, banjo, baritone guitar 
Dan Baird – Electric guitar, tambourine, background vocals, parade drum, baritone guitar, slide
Michael Grando – Drums 
Keith Christopher – Bass
Tammy Rogers – Violin, viola, mandolin, banjo, background vocals
Michael Webb – B-3 Organ, piano, accordions
Sonic Fedora – Trombone

Chart performance

Chris Knight (musician) albums
2008 albums